Luna rossa means red moon in Italian and may refer to:

Red Moon (1951 film)
Red Moon (2001 film)
Luna Rossa Challenge, America's Cup team and their boats
Luna Rossa Winery, U.S. winery

See also
Red Moon (disambiguation)